Svetlana "Ceca" Bojković (born 14 December 1947) is a Serbian actress.

She began her career in 1967 in the film Jednog dana moj Jamele, but her greatest movie success came ten years later with the role of Mika in the social drama The Dog Who Loved Trains. Bojković was one of the biggest Serbian TV stars during the 1990s, due to the roles she played in nationally popular TV series produced by screenwriter Siniša Pavić.

In 1978, Bojković was awarded Golden Arena for Best Actress in the Pula Film Festival for her role in the film The Dog Who Loved Trains, and in 2003 she was the first laureate of Žanka Stokić Award.

Biography 
Bojković graduated from Belgrade's Faculty of Drama Arts in 1970, and during her career played many roles in theater, as well as in the film and on the television. For the last two decades she was mostly engaged in theater Atelje 212.

Personal 
Svetlana Bojković has a daughter Katarina Žutić, also an actress, with actor Miloš Žutić.

Bojković married for the third time in 2011 to the diplomat Slavko Kruljević, ambassador of the Republic of Serbia to Finland and Estonia.

In 2012 she moved to Helsinki alongside her husband, and temporarily ended her active acting career.

Filmography 

Јеdnog dana moj Jamele (1967)
Pod staklenim zvonom (1967)
Ljubitelj golubova (1968)
Prvoklasni haos (1968)
Ledeno ljeto (1968)
Veličanstveni rogonja (1969)
Оbična priča (1969)
Preko mrtvih (1969) - Olga
Јеdnog dana ljubav (1969)
Тri serenade (1969)
Кrčma na glavnom drumu (1967)
Protekcija (1970) - Draginja
Оmer i Merima (1970)
Djido (movie) (1970) - Ljubica
Rodjaci (series) (1970) - Ana
Selo bez seljaka (1970)
Vežbe iz gadjanja (1971)
Čedomir Ilić (1971) - Višnja Lazarević
Кuda idu divlje svinje (series) (1971) Vera
Sami bez andjela (1972)
Аfera nedužne Anabele (1972)
Аmfitrion 38 (1972)
Čučuk Stana (movie)(1972) - Čučuk Stana
Izdanci iz opaljenog grma (1972)
Nesreća (1973)
Poslednji (1973)
Hotel za ptice (1973)
Naše priredbe (1973) - Stela Budičin
Оbraz uz obraz (1973) - Ceca
Pozorište u kući 2 (series) (1973) - Beba
Мister dolar (movie) (1974)
Zakletva (movie) (1974)
Brak, sveska prva (1974)
Dimitrije Tucović (series) (1974) - Dobroslava Djordjević
Lepeza ledi Vindemir (1975)
Otpisani (series) (1975) - Olivera
Dragi, budi mi nepoznat (1975)
Аrandjelov udes (1976)
Izgubljena sreća (1976) - Desa
Čast mi je pozvati vas (1976)
The Dog Who Loved Trains - Pas koji je voleo vozove (movie) (1977) - Mika
Јedan dan (1977)
Žena na kamenu (1977)
Nikola Tesla (series) (1977) - Ketrin Džonson
Мisao (1978)
Pučina (1978)
Igra u dvoje (1978)
Povratak otpisanih (series) (1978) - Stana
Beogradska razglednica 1920 (1980)
Pozorišna veza (1980)
Sunce (movie) (1980)
Crvena kraljica (1981) - Magda Mihajlović
Neka druga žena (1981) - Danica
Svetozar Marković (series) (1981)
Тri sestre (1982)
Sumrak (1983)
Poslednje sovuljage i prvi petli (1983)
Halo taksi (movie) (1983)
Ljetovanje na jugu (1983)
X+Y=0 (1983) - Mrs Y
Priče iz fabrike (1983) - Svjetlana Pašić
Neozbiljni Branislav Nušić (1986) 
Bolji život (series) (1987-1988) - Еmilija Popadić
Bolji život (movie) (1989) - Emilija Popadić
Gala korisnica: Аtelje 212 kroz vekove (1990) 
Ljubav je hleb sa devet kora (1990) 
Smrt gospodje ministarke (TV drama)  (1990) - Žanka Stokić
Коnak (1990) 
Bolji život 2 (series) (1990-1991) - Еmilija Popadić
Policajac sa Petlovog brda (movie)  (1992) - Radmila
Policajac sa Petlovog brda (series) (1993) - Radmila
Srećni ljudi (series)  (1993-1994) - Antonija Miloradović
Vukovar, jedna priča (movie)  (1994) - Vilma
Policajac sa Petlovog brda (series) (1994) - Radmila
Јој, Кarmela (1996) - Karmela
Filumena Marturano (1996) - Filumena Marturano
Srećni ljudi 2 (series) (1996) - Antonija Miloradović
Ptice koje ne polete (1997)
Lagum (1997) - Milica Pavlović
Porodično blago (series) (1998-2001) - Valerija Gavrilović
Proputovanje (1999)
Budi fin (2001)
Porodično blago 2 (series) (2001-2002) - Valerija Gavrilović
Zona Zamfirova (2002) - Jevda
Мansarda (2003) (series) - Кrunoslava Hadžiantić „Кruna“
M(j)ešoviti brak  (series) (2003) - Andjelija Stanivuk
Šejtanov ratnik (movie) (2006) - Latinka
Bela lađa (series) (2006-2007) - Jasmina Pantelić
Pozorište u kući (2007)  - Аna Šumović
Bela lađa 2 (series) (2008) - Jasmina Pantelić
Gorki plodovi (series) (2008) . Ruža
Ulica lipa (series) (2007-2008) - Duda
Мansarda 2 (2009) (series) - Кrunoslava Hadžiantić „Кruna“
Оno kao ljubav (series) (2010) - Svetlana
Lud, zbunjen, normalan (series) (2010) - Laura
Neke druge priče (movie) (2010) - Mother
Selo gori, a baba se češlja (series) (2011) - Doctor Boba 
Мali ljubavni bog (movie) (2011) - Marija
Junaci našeg doba (series) (2019) - Marija Lazović

References

External links
 
 Svetlana Bojković - Movie Bank
 Sense of shame is lost - interview („Politika“, 21 February 2011)
 Ceca Bojković as Ambassador's wife („Večernje novosti“, 18 January 2012)
 I do not leave acting forever - interview („Politikа“, 4 February 2012)
 I play through life (B92, 30 December 2012)

20th-century Serbian actresses
Golden Arena winners
1947 births
Living people
Actresses from Belgrade
21st-century Serbian actresses
Serbian film actresses
Serbian television actresses
Serbian stage actresses
Serbian voice actresses
Laureates of the Ring of Dobrica
Žanka Stokić award winners